Matijević or Matijevic is a South Slavic surname derived from masculine given name Matija, cognate of "Matthew" (compare English Matheson). It may refer to:
 Egon Matijevic (1922–2016), American chemist
 J. J. Matijevic (born 1995), American baseball player
 Jacob Matijevic (1947–2012), Croatian American robotics engineer
 Miljenko Matijevic (born 1964), Croatian American rock singer
 Slobodan Matijević (born 1988), Serbian bobsledder 
 Vladimir Matijević (1854-1929), Serbian entrepreneur
 Vladimir Matijević (footballer) (born 1957), Bosnian football player

See also
 

Croatian surnames
Serbian surnames
Patronymic surnames
Surnames from given names